Xhezair Shaqiri (born 15 May 1965), also known as Commander Hoxha, is a Macedonian politician of Albanian descent, Imam and a former member of the Kosovo Liberation Army (KLA) and National Liberation Army (NLA).

In 1998 he joined the KLA as a soldier and later became one of the first NLA commanders. During his participation in the Kosovo War, he first participated in the Battle of Glođane, in which the Yugoslav Army was defeated and had to retreat. He later was put into a unit under the command of Agim Ramadani with who he fought the Yugoslav Army during the Koshare ambush.

After the Kosovo War, He joined the NLA and was active in the Karadak region mainly in the villages of Tanuševci and Lipkovo and Aračinovo. He was the direct perpetrator of the murder of a Macedonian policeman in the shopping center Chairchanka in Skopje.

On 24 July 2001, he was placed on the Macedonian blacklist of citizens and 3 days later he was placed on the black list list of US President George W. Bush.

References 

1965 births
Living people
Macedonian politicians